Torquil Neilson is a former Australian actor.

Biography
Born in London and raised in Melbourne. He is best known for his role as Jason Cotter in Frontline which he played from 1994 to 1997. Neilson's other television roles include Blue Heelers, The Secret Life of Us and Love My Way. He has appeared in the films Love and Other Catastrophes (1996), Let's Get Skase (2001), He Died with a Felafel in His Hand (2001) and Packed to the Rafters (2010-2011). He also starred in the 2009 film Van Diemen's Land. Neilson was also a stage actor, having performed in several professional productions.

References

External links

Year of birth missing (living people)
Australian male stage actors
Australian male television actors
Australian male film actors
Male actors from Melbourne
Living people